Berberis trifolia is a shrub in the Berberidaceae described as a species in 1830. It is endemic to Mexico, known from the states of Hidalgo, Mexico, and Veracruz.

References

External links

trifolia
Flora of Mexico
Plants described in 1830